Green Dolphin Street is a novel by Elizabeth Goudge, first published by Hodder & Stoughton under the title Green Dolphin Country in 1944. The novel was adapted to a 1947 film. The novel won a $125,000 prize offered by Louis B. Mayer for a novel suitable for filming.

Plot summary
In the 19th century in the Channel Islands, the sisters Marianne and Marguerite fall in love with the same man, William Ozanne. He emigrates to New Zealand, and writes home asking the one he loves to join him and become his wife, but by a slip of the pen he names the wrong sister. When Marianne arrives instead of his beloved Marguerite, he accepts the inevitable and strives to make their marriage a success. After many years, William and Marianne return to the Channel Islands with their daughter.

References

1944 British novels
British novels adapted into films
Novels set in the Channel Islands
Novels set in New Zealand
Hodder & Stoughton books